William O'Neill (born October 21, 1981) is a right-handed professional ten-pin bowler who competes on the PBA Tour in North America.  A resident of Langhorne, Pennsylvania, his nickname on tour is "The Real Deal".  O'Neill has won 13 PBA Tour titles, including two major championships at the 2009–10 U.S. Open and the 2020 PBA Players Championship.

O'Neill was the first person to be a two time World Champion after winning the WTBA singles titles (gold medals) in 2010 and 2013.

Bill is a pro staff member for Hammer Bowling, Dexter shoes and Vise Grips.

Amateur career

O'Neill bowled collegiately for Saginaw Valley State University where he was a member of Sigma Pi fraternity. He earned first-team All American honors all four years he competed.  He was named Bowling Writers Association of America's Collegiate Bowler of the Year in 2001, 2003 and 2004.  He was also honored as the Most Valuable Player by the National Collegiate Bowling Coaches Association in 2003 and 2004.

In the 2020 Weber Cup, O'Neill and his Team USA teammates defeated Team Europe, 23–18. Overall in the event, O'Neill participated in 12 of 41 matches, going 3–2 in singles, 3–2 in doubles, and 1–1 in team.

PBA career

O'Neill was named PBA Rookie of the Year in his first full PBA season (2005–06), after making match play 11 times in 18 tournaments and appearing once in the TV finals.

Despite not winning a tournament, O'Neill had an excellent season in 2008-09.  He qualified for match play in a career-high 18 of 20 tournaments, made it to the championship round seven times (a career high until being matched in 2019), and narrowly missed winning the PBA's George Young High Average Award (222.96 to Wes Malott's 222.98).

After 83 tournaments and 11 previous finals appearances without winning, O'Neill finally earned his elusive first PBA Tour title in the PBA Chameleon Championship on September 6, 2009, defeating Ronnie Russell in the final match. That same season, O'Neill earned his second PBA Tour title and first major title at the 2009-10 67th Lumber Liquidators U.S. Open. After qualifying as the #2 seed, he defeated Tommy Jones in the semifinal match. He started slowly in the championship match against #1 seed and defending champ Mike Scroggins, converting a spare then leaving an open frame.  However, he then rolled the final 10 strikes of the game, for an easy 267–207 victory.

Bill won a then-career high $147,275 in the 2009–10 season. He finished the season tied with Walter Ray Williams, Jr. and Mike Scroggins in PBA Player of the Year points, but the honor went to Williams in an overall competition points tie-breaker.

At the 2010 PBA World Series of Bowling, Bill won the Pepsi Viper Championship for his third PBA Tour title. O'Neill also had the highest 60-game qualifying scores among all bowlers at the World Series. This earned him the #1 seed for the 2010–11 PBA World Championship, which took place January 14–16, 2011.  However, he was defeated in the title match by Chris Barnes.

He won the Alka Seltzer Plus Cold Cheetah Championship on November 10, 2012, beating Mike Wolfe for his fourth PBA Tour title. He then went without a title for all of calendar year 2013.

During the PBA's Summer Swing in 2014, O'Neill defeated Brian Valenta in the Lucas Oil PBA Badger Open to receive his fifth PBA title. O'Neill also won the special "King of the Swing" challenge at this event for an additional $10,000, though this was a non-title match.

At the 2015 Summer Swing, O'Neill qualified as the #1 seed in the PBA Oklahoma Open, and defeated Jason Belmonte in his lone match to win his sixth PBA title. O'Neill repeated his 2014 win in the King of the Swing (non-title) challenge event to earn an additional $10,000. Bill also finished third in two other Summer Swing events, taking home a total of $36,000 during the five-event series. On August 2, 2015, Bill won his seventh PBA title in the Striking Against Breast Cancer Mixed Doubles championship, teaming with PWBA player Shannon O'Keefe to take the top prize. This marked his first season since 2009–10 in which he had multiple titles.

In 2016, O'Neill and O'Keefe repeated as champions at the Striking Against Breast Cancer Mixed Doubles championship, giving O'Neill his eighth PBA title.

O'Neill collected his ninth PBA title on February 25, 2018, winning the Mark Roth-Marshall Holman PBA Doubles Championship with partner Jason Belmonte.

On January 6, 2019, O'Neill won his tenth PBA title (and first singles title since 2015) at the season-opening PBA Hall of Fame Classic. At World Series of Bowling X in March, he had top ten finishes in all four events and made two televised finals, but he didn't win a title. O'Neill qualified as the #7 seed for the inaugural PBA Tour Playoffs. He made it all the way to the June 2 finals in this event, but lost to Kristopher Prather. O'Neil cashed $40,000 for his runner-up finish, and surpassed the $1,000,000 mark in career earnings during the 2019 season. On August 11, O'Neill won his 11th PBA Tour title at the PBA Harry O'Neale Chesapeake Open. Having qualified as the top seed, he defeated A.J. Chapman in the championship finals for his second title of the 2019 season. O'Neill also won the $25,000 first prize in the FloBowling PBA ATX invite on September 21, 2019. This was a non-title elimination event featuring the top eight points-earners over the nine FloBowling PBA Summer Swing tournaments. Overall in 2019, O'Neill established career highs in cashes (21) and earnings ($185,148), and tied his career high with seven championship round appearances.

O'Neill qualified as the #1 seed for the 2020 PBA Tournament of Champions, but lost the championship match to Kristopher Prather. Six days later, on February 15, O'Neill won his twelfth PBA Tour title and second major at the 2020 PBA Players Championship in Columbus, Ohio. He qualified as the #3 seed for the stepladder finals, beating Kris Prather and Jason Belmonte in matches #2 and #3, and defeating E. J. Tackett in the championship match by one pin, 233–232. Based on 2020 points, O'Neill qualified as the #2 seed for the season-ending PBA Tour Playoffs, earning a bye into the Round of 16. On his way through the brackets, he defeated AJ Johnson, Kyle Troup and Tom Smallwood in single-game matches. He then defeated Anthony Simonsen in the double-elimination final match, 235–203 and 249–195. O'Neill was rewarded with his 13th PBA Tour title and the $100,000 first prize. On December 18, 2020, the PBA announced that O'Neill had finished runner-up to Jason Belmonte for 2020 PBA Player of the Year. Despite the 2020 season being shortened by COVID-19, O'Neill cashed a career-high $272,285.

Through 2019, O'Neill has recorded 30 perfect 300 games in PBA competition. He also has 10 PBA Regional titles.

PBA Tour titles
Major titles in bold type.

 2009–10 PBA Chameleon Championship (Allen Park, MI)
 2009–10 Lumber Liquidators U.S. Open (Indianapolis)
 2010–11 PBA Viper Championship (Las Vegas, NV)
 2012–13 PBA Cheetah Championship  (Las Vegas, NV)
 2014 PBA Badger Open (Shawnee, OK)
 2015 PBA Oklahoma Open (Shawnee, OK)
 2015 PBA/PWBA Striking Against Breast Cancer Mixed Doubles w/Shannon O'Keefe (Houston, TX)
 2016 PBA/PWBA Striking Against Breast Cancer Mixed Doubles w/Shannon O'Keefe (Houston, TX)
 2018 Mark Roth-Marshall Holman PBA Doubles Championship w/Jason Belmonte (Columbus, OH)
 2019 PBA Hall of Fame Classic (Arlington, TX)
 2019 PBA Harry O'Neale Chesapeake Open (Chesapeake, VA)
 2020 PBA Players Championship (Columbus, OH)
 2020 PBA Tour Playoffs (Centreville, VA)

World Series of Bowling

Wins (3)

O'Neill and Jason Belmonte are the only PBA bowlers to have won three PBA World Series of Bowling titles.

Results timeline
Results not in chronological order.

"T" = Tied for a place

International achievements

Bill is a seven-time member of Team USA. He bowled for Team USA at the 2010 WTBA World Men's Championships, where he won the gold medal match in singles over South Korea's Bok Eum Choi, 244–202. He also won a trios gold medal with Chris Barnes and Rhino Page, while helping Team USA to gold medals in team and all-events. In 2012, he became the first non-Finnish winner in the Ballmaster Open held in Helsinki.

Career statistics

Statistics are through the last complete PBA Tour season.

+CRA = Championship Round Appearances

Personal

Bill married Christi White in May 2010. White is a former NCAA bowler and graduate of Fairleigh Dickinson University.  Christi delivered the couple's first child, their son Gavin, in February 2013 and a daughter, Avery, in September 2017.

References

American ten-pin bowling players
1981 births
Living people
Saginaw Valley State University alumni
Bowlers at the 2011 Pan American Games
People from Langhorne, Pennsylvania
Place of birth missing (living people)
Pan American Games medalists in bowling
Pan American Games gold medalists for the United States
Medalists at the 2011 Pan American Games